Trondenes is an old parish and former municipality in Troms county in Norway.  The  municipality existed from 1838 until its dissolution in 1964.  It was located along the western shore of the Vågsfjorden in what is now Harstad Municipality.  Trondenes included the majority of the island of Grytøya and part of the eastern coast of the island of Hinnøya as well as some smaller islands.  Located just north of the town of Harstad, the village of Trondenes was the administrative centre of the municipality.  That village is also the site of the historic Trondenes Church, the northernmost medieval stone church in Norway.  The Trondenes Historical Center was built in 1997 near the church to teach about the history of the area.  Trondenes Fort is also located on the Trondenes peninsula.

History
The parish of Trondenes was established as a municipality on 1 January 1838 (see formannskapsdistrikt). The village of Harstad (population: 1,246) was declared a ladested and was therefore separated from Trondenes on 1 January 1904 to become a separate municipality.  This left Trondenes with 7,775 inhabitants. On 1 January 1912, part of southern Trondenes (population: 291) was transferred to the neighboring municipality of Evenes (in Nordland county).

On 1 July 1926, the municipality of Trondenes was divided into three separate municipalities.  The areas east of the Tjeldsundet strait and east of the Vågsfjorden (population: 2,443) became the municipality of Skånland and the areas on the west side of the Tjeldsundet and Vågsfjorden were split two ways. The southern part (population: 4,224) became the municipality of Sandtorg and the northern part (population: 3,429) remained as the municipality of Trondenes.  On 25 October 1956, a small border adjustment was made between Trondenes and the neighboring Kvæfjord Municipality. This resulted in 32 inhabitants becoming residents of Trondenes.

During the 1960s, there were many municipal mergers across Norway due to the work of the Schei Committee.  On 1 January 1964, Trondenes municipality (population: 6,567), Sandtorg municipality (population: 7,512), the town of Harstad (population: 3,808) were merged to form a new, larger Harstad Municipality.

Name
The municipality (originally the parish) was named after the old Trondenes farm (Old Norse: Þróndarnes), since the first Trondenes Church was built there. The first element is the genitive of þróndr which means "hog" and the last element is nes which means "headland". The shape of the headland was probably compared with the snout of a hog.

Government

Municipal council
The municipal council  of Trondenes was made up of 29 representatives that were elected to four year terms.  The party breakdown of the council was as follows:

Media gallery

See also
List of former municipalities of Norway

References

External links

 German Gun Battery on the peninsula Trondenes

Harstad
Former municipalities of Norway
1838 establishments in Norway
1964 disestablishments in Norway